Lectionary 329 (Gregory-Aland), designated by siglum ℓ 329 (in the Gregory-Aland numbering) is a Greek manuscript of the New Testament, on parchment. Palaeographically it has been assigned to the 11th century. The manuscript has not survived in complete condition.

Description 

The original codex contained lessons from the Gospel of John, Matthew, and Luke (Evangelistarium), with lacunae on 115 parchment leaves. The leaves are measured.

The text is written in Greek minuscule letters, in two columns per page, 28 lines per page.

It does not contain musical notes.

The codex contains weekday Gospel lessons from Easter to Pentecost and Saturday/Sunday Gospel lessons for the other weeks.

History 

Scrivener and Gregory dated the manuscript to the 11th or 12th century. It has been assigned by the Institute for New Testament Textual Research to the 11th century.

It once belonged to Sir F. Gage. It was purchased from Boone in 1860.

The manuscript was added to the list of New Testament manuscripts by Frederick Henry Ambrose Scrivener (278e) and Caspar René Gregory (number 329e). Gregory saw it in 1883.

The codex is housed at the British Library (Add MS 27860) in London.

The fragment is not cited in critical editions of the Greek New Testament (UBS4, NA28).

See also 

 List of New Testament lectionaries
 Biblical manuscript
 Textual criticism
 Lectionary 328

Notes and references

Bibliography

External links 
 

Greek New Testament lectionaries
11th-century biblical manuscripts
British Library additional manuscripts